Okita is a Japanese surname. Ōkita, sometimes spelled Ookita, is a different Japanese surname pronounced with a long vowel at the beginning. Notable people with these surnames include:
 , Japanese samurai in the Shinchōgumi police force of Edo (modern-day Tokyo)
 , sister of Okita Sōji
 , Japanese samurai in the Shinsengumi police force of Kyoto
 , Japanese Olympic discus thrower
 , Japanese economic and politician
 Dwight Okita (born 1958), American novelist of Japanese descent
 Jonathan Okita (born 1995), Belgian football forward
 Randall Okita, Canadian film director

Fictional characters with this surname include:

Jūzō Okita, a fictional character in Space Battleship Yamato
Sougo Okita, a swordsman based on Sōji Okita, from the anime and manga Gintama

Japanese-language surnames